The Securities and Futures Commission (SFC) of Hong Kong is the independent statutory body charged with regulating the securities and futures markets in Hong Kong.  The SFC is responsible for fostering an orderly securities and futures markets, to protect investors and to help promote Hong Kong as an international financial centre and a key financial market in China. Even though it is considered to be a branch of the government, it is run independently under the authorisation of the laws relating to Securities and Futures.

The head office is in One Island East in Quarry Bay.

History
The SFC was created in 1989 in response to the stock market crash of 1987.

In 1997 following the Asian financial crisis, the regulatory framework was further improved.

A comprehensive Securities and Futures Ordinance (SFO) was implemented in 2003, which expanded the SFC's regulatory functions and powers.

Andrew Sheng served as chairman of the SFC from 1998 until 2005, when he was succeeded by Martin Wheatley. Wheatley first served as chairman, and became CEO in 2006 when the posts of chairman and CEO were segregated to further promote corporate governance. Eddy Fong was appointed non-executive chairman in 2006. Ashley Alder assumed the position of CEO in 2011 and Carlson Tong was appointed non-executive chairman in 2012.

Responsibilities
The SFC is one of four regulatory organisations that make up financial regulators in Hong Kong, one of the major financial centres in the world.  The others are the Hong Kong Monetary Authority, Insurance Authority and the Mandatory Provident Fund Schemes Authority.  The SFC is responsible for securities and futures markets including the Hong Kong Stock Exchange, the seventh largest stock exchange in the world (See list of stock exchanges).

The SFC has a responsibility to maintain order and protect investors, it does this by carrying out the following tasks:

Setting and enforcing market regulations
Licensing and supervising market participants such as brokers, investment advisers and fund managers
Supervising market operators including exchanges, automated trading services and clearing houses
Authorising offering documents of investment products to be offered to the public
Overseeing corporate activities of listed companies under the Codes on Takeovers and Mergers and Share Repurchases
Educating investors on markets, investment products and their risks

Structure
The SFC is an independent statutory body whose powers derive from the Securities and Futures Ordinance (SFO) legislation.

The SFC is made up of a board whose members are appointed by the Chief Executive of Hong Kong for a fixed term, a majority of which must be independent Non-Executive Directors.  The board is headed by the Chairman also appointed by the Chief Executive of Hong Kong.

An executive committee led by a chief executive officer (CEO) reports to the board and the board chairman and he runs the agency on a day-to-day basis; this position was created in 2006. 

The SFC is funded by levies on transactions conducted on the Stock Exchange of Hong Kong (SEHK) and the Hong Kong Futures Exchange (HKFE), as well as fees charged to market participants.

List of chairmen 

 Robert John Richard Owen (1989–1992)
 Robert William Nottle (1992–1994)
 Anthony Francis Neoh (1995–1998)
 Andrew Sheng Len-tao (1998–2005)
 Martin Wheatley (2005–2006)
 Eddy Fong Ching (2006–2012)
 Carlson Tong Ka-shing (2012–2018)
 Tim Lui Tim-leung (2018–)

List of CEOs 
The position of CEO was created in 2006
Martin Wheatley (2006–2011)
 Ashley Ian Alder (2011–2022)
 Julia Leung Fung-yee (2023–)

HKSI Licensing Examination
The Licensing Examination for Securities and Futures Intermediaries (LE), a practical and market-focused examination, was developed with the assistance of regulators, academics and practitioners drawn from across the financial services industry. Its delegated by the SFC and conducted by the Hong Kong Securities Institute.

Criticisms 
The Hong Kong Securities and Investment Institute faces a lot of criticisms since the test were not checked or validated independently before implemented to the examinations. In addition to that, no formal appeal procedures or practices are in place to check and balances the legitimacy of such examinations. Discrepancies between different languages are commonplace with these examinations.

Candidates should be aware that neither SFC nor the Hong Kong Securities and Investment Institute (HKSI) endorses any study notes or practice questions.

See also
Securities commission
Financial Services and the Treasury Bureau
Economy of Hong Kong
Hong Kong Monetary Authority

References

External links
 Official web site

Hong Kong
Securities (finance)
Statutory bodies in Hong Kong
Hong Kong government departments and agencies